Dezhou or De Prefecture was a zhou (prefecture) in imperial China, centering on modern Dezhou, Shandong, China. It existed (intermittently) from 589 until 1913.

The modern prefectural-level city Dezhou, created in 1948, retains its name.

Geography
The administrative region of De Prefecture in the Tang dynasty is in modern northern Shandong and southeastern Hebei. It probably includes parts of modern: 
Under the administration of Dezhou, Shandong:
Dezhou
Pingyuan County
Under the administration of Hengshui, Hebei:
Jing County
Under the administration of Cangzhou, Hebei:
Wuqiao County

See also
Pingyuan Commandery

References
 

Prefectures of Later Han (Five Dynasties)
Prefectures of the Tang dynasty
Prefectures of the Sui dynasty
Prefectures of Later Tang
Prefectures of Yan (Five Dynasties period)
Prefectures of Later Jin (Five Dynasties)
Prefectures of the Song dynasty
Former prefectures in Shandong
Former prefectures in Hebei
Prefectures of Later Zhou
Prefectures of the Jin dynasty (1115–1234)
Prefectures of the Yuan dynasty
Subprefectures of the Ming dynasty
Departments of the Qing dynasty